Jeffrey Ventrella is a digital artist, programmer, and researcher. Ventrella was principal inventor and, with Will Harvey, co-founder of the virtual world There.

Career
Ventrella co-founded the virtual world product There.com in 1998. Ventrella motivated the conceptualization and implementation of "avatar-centric communication" at There. Ventrella subsequently worked as a Senior Developer at Linden Lab, makers of Second Life. Speaking on the official Second Life blog, former Linden Lab CEO Cory Ondrejka referred to Ventrella as "one of the world's experts on avatars and 3D communications."  One of Ventrella's core projects in Second Life was "avatar puppeteering," an area where he has also published scholarship.

Ventrella is also known as the author of GenePool, an artificial life game demonstrating Darwinian evolution.  He has published several articles in the artificial life community.  Prior to his career in virtual worlds, Ventrella joined Rocket Science Games in 1995, where he prototyped games and designed the artificial life simulator Darwin Pond.

Ventrella taught at the Centre for Digital Media at Great Northern Way Campus, in Vancouver, British Columbia. He frequently appears on the Biota.org podcast.

Education
Ventrella holds a master's degree in Media Arts and Sciences from the MIT Media Lab and a Master of Fine Arts in Computer Graphics from Syracuse University.

Publications
 "Avatar Physics and Genetics," Lecture Notes in Computer Science, 2000
 "Evolving Structure in Liquid Music," The Art of Artificial Evolution, 2008
 "GenePool: Exploring the Interaction Between Natural Selection and Sexual Selection," Artificial Life Models in Software, 2005
 "Emergence of Morphology and Locomotion Behavior in Animated Characters," Artificial Life IV, 1994
 "Gliders and Riders"
 "Evolving the Mandelbrot Set to Imitate Figurative Art"

External links
 Link to Biota.org interview
 Ventrella home page
 Melody Ball
 Gene Pool
 Avatar Puppeteering
 Divisor Plot
 Birth of There.com

References

Year of birth missing (living people)
Living people
Video game programmers
Syracuse University alumni
Massachusetts Institute of Technology alumni